Spartan APC may refer to the following types of armoured personnel carriers:

FV103 Spartan, a British Army tracked vehicle
Streit Group Spartan APC, a wheeled vehicle of Canadian origin